The 1972 United States Senate election in New Mexico took place on November 7, 1972. Incumbent Democratic U.S. Senator Clinton Presba Anderson did not run for re-election. Republican Pete Domenici defeated Democrat Jack Daniels to win the open seat.

Democratic primary

Candidates 
Jack Daniels, former New Mexico State Representative
Roberto Mondragón, incumbent Lieutenant Governor of New Mexico
David L. Norvell, incumbent Attorney General of New Mexico
Thomas G. Morris, former U.S. Representative

Results

Republican primary

Candidates 
Pete Domenici, former Mayor of Albuquerque
David Cargo, former Governor of New Mexico

Results

General election

Results

References

External links

New Mexico
1972
1972 New Mexico elections